COVID-19 pandemic in New York may refer to:

 COVID-19 pandemic in New York (state), cases in the entire state
 COVID-19 pandemic in New York City, cases in New York City alone